BD+48 740 is a giant star suspected of having recently engulfed one of its planets. The star has an overabundance of lithium in its atmosphere, a metal that is destroyed by nuclear reactions in stars.

Planetary system
Detection of radial velocity variations have led to the discovery of the superjovian planet in 2012, with discovery confirmed in 2018. A companion planet of minimal mass 1.7 is in a highly eccentric orbit, making the orbits of other planets unstable. These indications make the discoverers conclude that another planet has recently plunged into the star, been destroyed, and contributed its lithium content to the star.

References

External links
 

Perseus (constellation)
K-type giants
BD+48 0740
012684
J02425822+4855483
Planetary systems with one confirmed planet